Chris Farasopoulos (born July 20, 1949 in Piraeus, Greece) is an American Football player, Brigham Young alumnus and retired Business Executive.

After being titled "The Galloping Greek" by the ‘’Arizona Republic while playing football at Brigham Young University , Farasopoulos turned down a professional baseball contract with the Baltimore Orioles, choosing instead to accept a full and guaranteed football scholarship from Brigham Young University.

In kind with the social and ethnic tensions of the late 1960s, there was some controversy regarding Farasopoulos's decision to refuse the contract offer when it became known that he had also been asked to abbreviate his typically long Greek last name. He is remembered for saying, "It is what it is." 

Best known for his agility and speed at BYU, Farasopoulos played defensive back as well as punt and kickoff return. In 1968, he set a Western Athletic Conference record for average yards returned per kickoff at 27.2, a record that stood until Chad Owens's 29.4 average yards per return years later.

After selecting John Riggins and John Mooring in the first and second rounds of the 1971 NFL Draft, the New York Jets chose Farasopoulos in the third round with the 58th pick overall. During his rookie season, he began a lasting friendship with teammates Riggins and Burgess Owens . All three were known for the spirit they contributed to the New York Jets team. Later in his career Farasopoulos played for the New Orleans Saints.

Farasopoulos holds a BS in human performance from Brigham Young University and spent 13 years at Integrated Device Technology Inc. in various operations management positions both at IDT's Technology Center and IDT's Static RAM Division in Salinas, California. Before joining IDT, Farasopoulos held management positions at VLSI Technology Inc. and National Semiconductor. Most recently Farasopoulos was responsible for customer operations and business development as vice president with QuickSil of Fremont, California.

Farasopoulos is the only son of Vasilios Farasopoulos and Theodora Farasopoulos. Farasopoulos is married, has three daughters (two of whom are twins) and lives with his family in California.

See also 
 List of NCAA major college yearly punt and kickoff return leaders

References

1949 births
Living people
American football safeties
Greek players of American football
BYU Cougars football players
New Orleans Saints players
New York Jets players
Greek emigrants to the United States
Sportspeople from Piraeus